In visual media such as television and film, sexposition is the technique of providing exposition against a backdrop of sex or nudity. The Financial Times defined sexposition as "keeping viewers hooked by combining complex plot exposition with explicit sexual goings-on". Its purpose, according to James Poniewozik, is to divert the audience and give characters something to do while exposition is being delivered, which is what distinguishes sexposition from merely gratuitous titillation.

Etymology
The term was coined by the blogger and critic Myles McNutt in his post on the HBO TV series Game of Thrones episode named "You Win or You Die", posted in May 2011; see link in External Links section below.

In this blog post McNutt used the term to describe scenes in which characters reveal crucial information related to plot and character development during intimate scenes. Author George R. R. Martin said this technique is in line with the purpose of sexuality in the A Song of Ice and Fire books, and acknowledged that this technique allows for the exposition of motivations and incentives not available to the TV show. As the show has to convey details of many characters and backstories from the books, sexposition is useful to deliver the information to viewers in condensed form.

The term has since been retroactively applied to similar practices in earlier works, including the HBO shows Deadwood and The Sopranos (frequently set in strip clubs), many older cop films (likewise), and the comic strip Jane. According to James Poniewozik, the novelty of the practice is not the nudity, but the manner in which it accompanies exposition, for which older TV shows with less complex plots did not have as much need.

Criticism
Some critics have disapproved of sexposition because, in their view, it uses inappropriate tactics, insults the audience's intelligence by appealing and succumbing to carnality and covers up the screenwriter's failure to build cohesive narratives, having to rely on long drawn out sequences of exposition made watchable only through appeals to sexuality. Some criticize sexposition for catering almost exclusively to heterosexual men. Director Neil Marshall recalled during the filming of the second-season Game of Thrones episode "Blackwater" that one of the executive producers repeatedly urged him to add more full-frontal nudity. According to Marshall this executive producer explained to him: "[e]veryone else in the series is drama side. I represent the pervy side of the audience", an experience that Marshall described as "pretty surreal" to happen on the set of a major network production.

Game of Thrones showrunner David Benioff admitted that he does "pay less attention to intricate plot points delivered during sex scenes", and co-creator D. B. Weiss agreed, saying that "Sex grabs people's attention. But once it has their attention, it tends not to let go of it." While the effect is reportedly different for different directors, they say "Every one of those sex scenes is there because we wanted that particular scene in the show. There is not a sex scene quota from HBO." Time reported before the seventh season in 2017 that "Even if Benioff and Weiss don’t always admit it, the show has changed. Scenes in which exposition is delivered in one brothel or another, for example, have been pared back."

Huffington Post critic Maureen Ryan contrasted sexposition—which she said was useful if used to convey much information that would otherwise be boring—with "H.B." ("Hey, boobs!"), which she described as scenes that only exist to show (usually female) nudity.

Satire
Fan site Winter is Coming cited an April 2012 sketch on Saturday Night Live as a satire of sexposition when discussing Marshall's anecdote. Aired before the Marshall interview was published, the skit purported to be an episode of HBO First Look featuring Adam Friedberg, 13-year-old "creative consultant" to Game of Thrones. Played by Andy Samberg, the teenage boy was proud of "mak[ing] sure there are lots of boobs" and various sexual acts during expository scenes. Author Martin (Bobby Moynihan) called Friedberg "a visionary. He knows that even when I didn't write sex into a scene, I was definitely thinking about it". The real Martin is aware of the skit, joking at San Diego Comic-Con that Friedberg could not attend because "[t]here was a scene in Belfast with no boobies in it" which he needed to fix.

References

External links
 original Myles McNutt blog post using the term for the first time

2010s neologisms
Narrative techniques
Sexuality in fiction